The men's horizontal bar was a gymnastics event contested as part of the Gymnastics at the 1964 Summer Olympics programme at the Tokyo Metropolitan Gymnasium. The event was held on 18, 20, and 23 October. There were 128 competitors from 29 nations, with nations in the team competition having up to 6 gymnasts and other nations entering up to 3 gymnasts. The event was won by Boris Shakhlin of the Soviet Union, the nation's first victory in the horizontal bar after two Games with silver and bronze medals. The Soviets also took silver, with Yuri Titov finishing second. Shakhlin (bronze in 1960) and Titov (silver in 1956) were the fifth and sixth men to win multiple medals in the horizontal bar. Bronze went to Miroslav Cerar of Yugoslavia.

Background

This was the 11th appearance of the event, which is one of the five apparatus events held every time there were apparatus events at the Summer Olympics (no apparatus events were held in 1900, 1908, 1912, or 1920). Five of the six finalists from 1960 returned: two-time gold medalist Takashi Ono of Japan, bronze medalist Boris Shakhlin of the Soviet Union, fourth-place finisher Yukio Endo of Japan, fifth-place finisher (and 1956 silver medalist) Yury Titov of the Soviet Union, and sixth-place finisher Miroslav Cerar of Yugoslavia. (All five would make the final again in 1964.) Ono was the reigning (1962) world champion as well, with Endo a silver medalist and Titov and Cerar finalists.

Algeria, the Republic of China, Iran, and Mongolia each made their debut in the men's parallel bars. The United States made its 10th appearance, most of any nation, having missed only the inaugural 1896 Games.

Competition format

The gymnastics all-around events continued to use the aggregation format. Each nation entered a team of six gymnasts or up to two individual gymnasts. All entrants in the gymnastics competitions performed both a compulsory exercise and a voluntary exercise for each apparatus. The scores for all 12 exercises were summed to give an individual all-around score.

These exercise scores were also used for qualification for the apparatus finals. The two exercises (compulsory and voluntary) for each apparatus were summed to give an apparatus score; the top 6 in each apparatus participated in the finals; others were ranked 7th through 128th. For the apparatus finals, the all-around score for that apparatus was multiplied by one-half then added to the final round exercise score to give a final total.

Exercise scores ranged from 0 to 10, with the final total apparatus score from 0 to 20.

Schedule

All times are Japan Standard Time (UTC+9)

Results

Each gymnast competed in both compulsory and optional exercises, with the median scores from the four judges for the two sets of exercises were summed. This score was also used in calculating both individual all-around and team scores.

The top 6 advanced to the final for the apparatus, keeping half of their preliminary score to be added to their final score.

References

Sources
 

Gymnastics at the 1964 Summer Olympics
Men's 1964
Men's events at the 1964 Summer Olympics